Marblehead High School is a public high school located in Marblehead, Massachusetts.

History
The school has approximately 970 students.   The current campus began construction in 2001, and opened for the 2002–2003 school year. In 2002, National Grand Bank opened a student-operated bank branch in the school.

Academics
The school currently employs approximately 70 teachers among five core subjects (Mathematics, English language, Social Studies, and the Sciences), foreign languages (Spanish language, French language, and Latin), as well as special education staff and tutors.

Athletics
Currently, Marblehead High School has over thirty sports teams for fall, winter, and spring sports. The school mascot for most sports is the Magician. However, the boys' ice hockey team is known as the Headers, continuing the insistence of former head coach Bob Roland, who coached the team from 1962-1992. Marblehead High School athletics has had significant success in recent years, winning numerous conference and state titles in the past several years, including a state title in hockey in 2011, and their first ever state title in boys cross country in 2015.

Fall sports
  Boys Cross-Country 
(NEC Champs 2015, 2018, 2019, 2021)
  Girls Cross-Country
  Field Hockey
  Football
  Golf
  Boys Soccer
  Girls Soccer
  Football Cheerleading
  Volleyball
Winter sports
  Boys Basketball
  Girls Basketball
  Boys Ice Hockey
(Div 3 North Champions 2008, 2010, 2011)
(State Champs 2011)
(NEC Champions 2016)
  Girls Ice Hockey
  Boys Swimming
  Girls Swimming
(State Champions 2011, 2016)
(NEC Champions 2005-2016)
  Gymnastics
  Boys Indoor Track
  Girls Indoor Track
  Ski Team
Spring sports
  Baseball
  Softball
  Boys Lacrosse
  Girls Lacrosse
  Boys Spring Track
  Girls Spring Track
  Boys Tennis
  Girls Tennis
  Sailing

Notable alumni
Keith Ablow, psychiatrist
Abdul-Malik Abu (born 1995), basketball player in the Israeli Premier Basketball League
Rob Delaney, comedian
Shalane Flanagan, Olympic long-distance runner
Loyd Grossman, author
Dick Hinch, member of the New Hampshire House of Representatives
Bob Ingalls, professional football player
Joel Mark Noe, surgeon
Bruce Rosenbaum, artist
Cory Schneider, professional ice hockey player
Charlie Semine, actor
Amy Siskind, activist

See also
List of high schools in Massachusetts

References

Schools in Essex County, Massachusetts
Public high schools in Massachusetts
Buildings and structures in Marblehead, Massachusetts
Northeastern Conference